The 1912 Texas A&M Aggies football team was an American football team that represented the Agricultural and Mechanical College of Texas—now known as Texas A&M University—as a member of the Southern Intercollegiate Athletic Association (SIAA) during the 1912 college football season. In their fourth year under head coach Charley Moran, the Aggies compiled an overall record of 8–0 with a conference mark of 2–0, finishing second in the SIAA.

Schedule

References

Texas AandM
Texas A&M Aggies football seasons
Texas AandM Aggies football